Fiery serpent may refer to:

 Boi-tatá, a creature in Brazilian mythology
 Dracunculus medinensis or Guinea worm, a long string-like worm causing dracunculiasis
 Fiery flying serpent, a creature mentioned in the Bible
 Fiery serpents, evil entities common to Slavic mythology